Mullarkey is a surname, the Anglicised form of the Gaelic Ó Maoilearca, meaning 'descendant of the devotee of Saint Earc'. Notable people with the surname include:

Des Mullarkey (1899–1975), Australian cricketer
John Mullarkey, professor in film and television
Kelvin Mullarkey (1951–2018), British speedway rider
Mary Mullarkey (1943-2021), American judge
Melanius Mullarkey, Saint Lucian footballer
Neil Mullarkey (born 1961), English actor, writer and comedian
Rory Mullarkey (born 1987), Canadian playwright and librettist
Sam Mullarkey (born 1987), English former professional footballer

References

Anglicised Irish-language surnames